The 1980 Portland Timbers season was the sixth season for the Portland Timbers in the now-defunct North American Soccer League.

Squad 
The 1980 squad

North American Soccer League

National Conference, Western Division standings 

Pld = Matches played; W = Matches won; L = Matches lost; GF = Goals for; GA = Goals against; GD = Goal difference; Pts = PointsSource:

League results 

* = Shootout winSource:

References

1980
American soccer clubs 1980 season
1980 in sports in Oregon
Portland
1980 in Portland, Oregon